is a railway station on the Kita-Shinano Line in Iizuna, Nagano, Japan, operated by the third-sector railway operating company Shinano Railway.

Lines
Mure Station is served by the 37.3 km Kita-Shinano Line and is 18.6 kilometers from the starting point of the line at Nagano Station.

Station layout
The station has two opposed ground-level side platforms connected to the station building by a footbridge. The station is staffed.

Platforms

Adjacent stations

History 
The station opened on 1 May 1888. With the privatization of Japanese National Railways (JNR) on 1 April 1987, the station came under the control of East Japan Railway Company (JR East).

From this date, Mure Station was transferred to the ownership of the third-sector operating company Shinano Railway.

Passenger statistics
In fiscal 2013, while still under the control of JR East, the station was used by an average of 767 passengers daily (boarding passengers only).

Surrounding area
Iizuna Town Hall

See also
List of railway stations in Japan
Sanuki-Mure Station

References

External links

  

Railway stations in Japan opened in 1888
Railway stations in Nagano Prefecture
Kita-Shinano Line
Nagano Electric Railway
Iizuna, Nagano